Pit firing is the oldest known method for the firing of pottery. Examples have been dated as early as 29,000–25,000 BCE, while the earliest known kiln dates to around 6000 BCE, and was found at the Yarim Tepe site in modern Iraq.  Kilns allow higher temperatures to be reached, and use fuel more efficiently, and have long replaced pit firing as the most widespread method of firing pottery, although the technique still finds limited use amongst certain studio potters and in Africa.

Unfired pots are nestled together in a pit in the ground and are surrounded with combustible materials such as wood, shavings, dried manure, leaves, and sometimes metal oxides and salts to affect the surface of the pots.  The top of the pit may be protected with moist clay, shards, larger pieces of wood or metal baffles. The filled pit is then set on fire and carefully tended until most of the inner fuel has been consumed.  At around 1,100°C (2,000°F) the maximum temperatures are moderate compared to other techniques used for pottery, and the pottery produced counts as earthenware.  After cooling, pots are removed and cleaned; there may be patterns and colours left by ash and salt deposits. Pots may then be waxed and buffed to create a smooth glossy finish.

Modern use

Pit-firing continued in some parts of Africa until modern times.  In Mali, a firing mound, a large version of the pit, is still used at Kalabougou to make pottery that is commercial, mainly made by the women of the village to be sold in the towns.  Unfired pots are first brought to the place where a mound will be built, customarily by the women and girls of the village. The mound's foundation is made by placing sticks on the ground, then:

Pit-firing is continued to be used by Pueblo potters, in particular in New Mexico, and other areas of the American Southwest. This pottery is handmade, and potters dig clay locally to produce their wares. Tempering agents like sand, volcanic ash or pieces of ground-up broken pottery are combined with the clay to harden it during the firing process. The vessels are then pit-fired in the ground. Wood, dung, coal or other locally sourced materials are used as fuel.

See also
Pueblo pottery
Black-on-black ware

References

Hamer, Frank and Janet. The Potter's Dictionary of Materials and Techniques. A & C Black Publishers, Limited, London, England, Third Edition 1991. .

External links
Short article on pit firing.
Brief 'How to' article.

Pottery